Julio Gamboa (born December 15, 1971 in Nicaragua) is a Nicaraguan lightweight boxer. He currently resides in León, Nicaragua.

See also 

List of IBF world champions

External links 

1971 births
Living people
Nicaraguan male boxers
Sportspeople from León, Nicaragua
Lightweight boxers